Jonathan Mason (September 12, 1756November 1, 1831) was a Federalist United States Senator and Representative from Massachusetts during the early years of the United States.

Mason was born in Boston in the Province of Massachusetts Bay. He attended Boston Latin School the College of New Jersey (now Princeton University), graduating in 1774. After studying law, he was admitted to the bar in 1779.

On April 13, 1779, Mason married Susannah Powell. They had five daughters and two sons:
Miriam Clarke; married David Sears
Susan Powell; married John Collins Warren
Anna Powell
Mary Bromfield
Elizabeth; married Samuel Dunn Parker
Jonathan
William Powel; father of Elizabeth Rogers Mason Cabot

In 1780, Mason delivered the annual address marking the Boston Massacre.

He was a Member of the Massachusetts House of Representatives from 1786 to 1796.

Starting in 1795, Mason was a partner in the Mount Vernon Proprietors, a developer of real estate in Boston's Beacon Hill neighborhood. Around 1800 he built a mansion for himself on Mt. Vernon Street, in which he lived through the end of his life. Around 1804 he hired architect Charles Bulfinch to design 4 houses, also on Mt. Vernon Street, for each of his daughters; the 4 houses still stand today.

Mason was also a member of the South Boston Association, which developed real estate in Dorchester.

From 1797 to 1798, he served with the Massachusetts Governor's Council and was elected for the following two years, and was in the Massachusetts Senate from 1799 to 1800. Following the resignation of Senator Benjamin Goodhue, he was elected to the U.S. Senate, where he served from November 14, 1800, to March 3, 1803. He then resumed his law practice and served again in the Massachusetts Senate from 1803 to 1804 and the Massachusetts House from 1805 to 1808.

His portrait was painted by Gilbert Stuart in 1805.

He served again in the US House of Representatives from March 4, 1817, to May 15, 1820, whereupon he resigned to pursue his law practice. He died in Boston, at age 75. He is interred in Mount Auburn Cemetery in Cambridge, Massachusetts.

References

Further reading
Obituary. Columbian Centinel, November 6, 1831.
Mary Caroline Crawford. Famous families of Massachusetts. 1930.

1756 births
1831 deaths
Boston Latin School alumni
Princeton University alumni
Massachusetts state senators
Members of the Massachusetts House of Representatives
United States senators from Massachusetts
Federalist Party United States senators
Burials at Mount Auburn Cemetery
Federalist Party members of the United States House of Representatives from Massachusetts
People from colonial Boston